Sheikh Saeed bin Maktoum bin Hasher Al Maktoum (1878 – 9 September 1958) was the longest-serving Ruler of Dubai, from 1912 until his death in 1958. He presided over Dubai during the end of the pearling boom and through the long and difficult recession that followed the collapse of the pearling market, transforming Dubai into an active trading hub which developed new markets and economic opportunities.

Despite continuing a long tradition of liberal, trade-minded rulers, he faced pressure from a number of leading figures in Dubai to reform the governance of the town and was eventually forced to quell what became an active rebellion against his rule.

In later life he ceded many of the responsibilities for driving Dubai's economic growth to his son, Rashid.

Background 
Saeed bin Maktoum was the son of Maktoum bin Hasher, who ruled Dubai from 1894 to 1906. Following Maktoum's death, his cousin Butti bin Suhail Al Maktoum ruled for six years, before his own death in 1912.

Aged 34 at his accession, Sheikh Saeed inherited a small but thriving trading port and a pearling centre which employed some 7,000 men in the seasonal trade. A simple man, Saeed travelled to hunt in the desert and was respected for his staunch Islamic values.

Relations with neighbouring sheikhs were stable, as was Saeed's relationship with the British. The pearling industry was lucrative and trade was based on a lively re-export market, particularly to surrounding Arab sheikhdoms and Persia.

Following the movement of merchants from Lingeh to Dubai in the early years of the 20th century, another migration took place with increasingly restrictive conditions for trade being experienced in Southern Persia. Many more merchants from the areas of Bastak and Lingeh moved to Dubai, where they were welcomed. A number had established businesses in Dubai but hadn't moved their families and, in the 1920s, many of these made the move to Dubai permanent. There had long been a trading relationship between Dubai and Bastak, with the latter being a major source of firewood for the coastal communities of the Persian Gulf.

The collapse of the pearl trade 
As this new influx of trading families took place, storm clouds were brewing over the pearling market. The Japanese cultured pearl, first a wonder shown at expos and other fairs, started to be produced in commercial quantities in the late 1920s. The influx of inexpensive, high quality pearls to world markets took place alongside the economic blight of the Great Depression. The result on the Persian Gulf's pearl markets was devastating. In 1929, 60 of Dubai's pearling boats (in 1907 there were 335 boats operating out of the port) stayed in port throughout the season. The complex system of financing that underpinned the pearling industry, the relationship between owners, pearl merchants, nakhudas (captains) and divers and pullers fell apart and left an increasingly large number of working men in the town facing destitution.

A record number of slaves approached the British Agent seeking manumission, a reflection of the parlous state of the pearling fleet and its owners.

In 1934, Sheikh Rashid concluded an agreement with Imperial Airways for flights to take place through Dubai, with flights commencing in 1937. The agreement brought welcome revenue. He also signed a preliminary agreement for an oil concession (with British company Petroleum Concessions Ltd) on 22 May 1937, stipulating that local labour would have to be used in an effort to create employment for the people of Dubai. Alongside these efforts, Dubai's traders found new markets in Persia, trading sugar, tea, cloth, hides and even cement into the Persian mainland. Their increasing prosperity came a time when Dubai's traditional wealthy class, the pearl merchants and boat owners, faced penury. This led to growing tensions and rising discontent among some of the more influential families of the town.

Majlis 
The Majlis movement of 1938 was a reflection of the discontent felt by a number of leading figures in Dubai, including members of the Maktoum family itself. In October 1938 the situation had deteriorated to the point where Dubai was split into two armed camps by its creek: Deira was held by the discontented members of the Al Bu Falasah and Bur Dubai by Sheikh Saeed and his followers. Following mediation by other Rulers and the British Political Agent, who travelled from Bahrain, on 20 October an agreement was signed establishing the Majlis, a consultative council of fifteen leading community members to be headed by Sheikh Saeed.

The Majlis set up a number of Municipal bodies, including a Municipal Council and a Council of Merchants, as well as the post of Director of Education, taken by Sheikh Mana Al Maktoum. The Majlis wasn't only concerned with practical matters, however, but also sought to limit the Ruler's financial standing and call for political reform.

Sheikh Saeed quickly became disconcerted with the Majlis process and recused himself from the meetings of the council. On 29 March 1939, the Majlis was dissolved when a number of its members were attacked by Bedouin attending his son's wedding in Deira.

Economic growth 
Although he was to rule for a further 20 years, Saeed increasingly avoided political life and ceded the administration of Dubai to Sheikh Rashid, his son. It came to Rashid to implement many of the reforms the Majlis had called for and also to add his own impetus to the drive to develop and reform Dubai, transforming the small trading port into a modern city-state within a generation.

By 1950, the British Residency was clearly at a loss to explain the source of Dubai's wealth, which had by now grown to be considerable:"Dubai, in contrast with the moribund Sharjah eleven miles away, is a flourishing town... there is already a business-like air around the place, thanks to the Post Office, the bank, a branch of Messrs Gray, Mackenzie and the offices of Petroleum Development (Trucial Coast) Limited... to judge by the prosperous appearance of the bazaar and by the lively atmosphere of the whole town, its income, for a miniature port of perhaps eight to ten thousand inhabitants must even today be considerable. The Sheikh and the merchants give one the impression they are not dissatisfied with present blessings and that they view the future hopefully."

In 1954 Dubai became a municipality.

The increasing activities of Petroleum Development (Trucial Coast), which had secured a number of exploratory concessions in the area, meant increased economic activity and Dubai acted to accommodate the infrastructure required to take the opportunity. In 1954, Sir William Halcrow and Partners were brought in to survey the Creek and then the Overseas Ast Company carried out the dredging operation. Loans, the issue of 'Creek Bonds' and reselling the land reclaimed by the dredging operations all helped to pay for the operation, which took place through the end of 1958 and into 1959. By now Sheikh Saeed was elderly and infirm and the British were urging Sheikh Rashid to take over from his father, which he refused to do.

Family 
Saeed married Sheikha Hessa bint Al Murr, the mother of all his children except his youngest child, Ahmed.  Saeed married a second time to Sheikha Fatima bint Ahmed bin Suliman.

Death 
Sheikh Saeed died early in the morning of 10 September 1958 at the age of 80 and was succeeded by his eldest son, Sheikh Rashid bin Saeed Al Maktoum. Two months after Saeed's death, his second wife bore a son, Sheikh Ahmed bin Saeed Al Maktoum, on 1 December of that year. Sheikh Ahmed today serves as Chairman and CEO of Emirates Airline.

See also 
 Al Maktoum

References

1878 births
1958 deaths
Emirati politicians
Saeed Bin Maktoum Bin Hasher
Rulers of Dubai
20th-century Emirati people